Sartuf-e Delik (also Romanized as Sartūf-e Delīk; also known as Sar Ţūf and Sartūf) is a village in Doshman Ziari Rural District, in the Central District of Kohgiluyeh County, Kohgiluyeh and Boyer-Ahmad Province, Iran. At the 2006 census, its population was 29, in 4 families.

References 

Populated places in Kohgiluyeh County